The Latin Music Hall of Fame may refer one of the following:
The Billboard Latin Music Hall of Fame, an award presented by Billboard magazine established in 1994.
The International Latin Music Hall of Fame, established in 1999